Trataka is a 2018 Indian Kannada film written and directed by Shivaganesh. Trataka is a story about an ACP who suffers from Complex Partial Seizure. His brother is murdered. He has two close friends and a love interest who are helping him in finding the killer. The film has loads of blood and goriness attached to it. Trataka was released on 31 August 2018. The film released to negative reviews.

Cast 
Rahul Ainapur as Jaidev aka Deva
Ajith Jayraj as  Ravi 
Yash Shetty as Sharath 
Hridaya Avanthi as Dr Pavithra Radhakrishna

References 

2010s Kannada-language films
Films directed by Shiva Ganesh